Ääniä Yössä (Finnish for "Voices in the night") is the fifth full-length studio album by the black metal band Horna. It was released on Debemur Morti Productions in 2006.

Track listing
All songs written and arranged by Shatraug and Corvus.
"Raiskattu Saastaisessa Valossa" – 9:25 (Translation: "Raped In Filthy Light") 
"Noutajan Kutsu" – 4:41 (Translation: "Call of the Reaper")
"Mustan Surman Rukous" – 8:12 (Translation: "Black Death Prayer")
"Ääni Yössä" – 21:21 (Translation: "A Voice In the Night")

Personnel
Corvus: Vocals
Shatraug: Guitars, Vocals
Infection: Bass
Vainaja: Drums

Additional personnel
Christophe Szpajdel - logo

External links
Metal Archives
Official Horna site

Horna albums
2006 albums